The Hellenic Republic Asset Development Fund S.A. (HRADF; , Tameio Axiopoiisis Idiotikis Periousias tou Dimosiou) or TAIPED is a direct subsidiary of the Hellenic Corporation of Assets and Participations. HRADF exploits the assets of Greece that have been assigned to it and manages the implementation of the privatization program in Greece, and in specific, the implementation of the Asset Development Plan "ADP."

Portfolio

Infrastructure 
 Public Power Corporation S.A. (government retains 34.12% owned by Greek government)
Piraeus Port Authority (government retains 7.14%)
Thessaloniki Port Authority (government retains 7.27%)
 Marinas of Hydra, Poros and Epidavros
 Marinas of Chios and Pylos
 Athens International Airport (government retains 25%; privatisation of 30% stake held by the Hellenic Republic Asset Development Fund is in progress)
 Schinias Olympic Rowing and Canoeing Centre
 Markopoulo Olympic Equestrian Centre
 Galatsi Olympic Hall
 Athens Water Supply and Sewerage Company
Thessaloniki Water Supply and Sewerage Company
South Kavala Natural Gas Storage

Corporate 
Hellenic Petroleum (35.5%)
Hellenic Post
Public Gas Corporation

Land development 
Boutique Hotels
Kassandra Golf (Kassandra)
Peace and Friendship Stadium

Privatisations 
Egnatia odos
TrainOSE
ROSCO (railway maintenance company)
Marinas of Alimos (concession of 40 years awarded to Ellaktor
Ellinikon airport (see also Hellenikon Metropolitan Park)

References 

Privatization funds
Government-owned companies of Greece
Investment promotion agencies
Financial services companies established in 2011
2011 establishments in Greece
Greek government-debt crisis